Matthew Hopper (17 January 1893 – 1978) was an English footballer who made 82 appearances in the Football League playing for Millwall, Coventry City and Ashington. He played as an outside right.

Hopper, a native of Ashington, began his career in non-league football, including contributing to Lincoln City's Midland League title in 1920–21. When he signed for Third Division club Millwall in April 1921, the Daily Express reported how "the spectators appreciated his clever wing play and shooting" when Lincoln eliminated Millwall from the FA Cup earlier in the year. He made his Football League debut on 30 April, against Southampton, "proved as speedy and as hard a worker" as in that Cup tie, and was expected to "do better when he has had more experience with his new colleagues". By the end of the 1921–22 season, the Express rated him "one of the most improved players in the team". At the end of the next, Hopper left Millwall, and played non-league football until resuming his league career in 1926 with Coventry City and then Ashington. His last club was Annfield Plain in his native north-east of England.

References

1893 births
1978 deaths
Sportspeople from Ashington
Footballers from Northumberland
English footballers
Association football outside forwards
Percy Main Amateurs F.C. players
Ashington A.F.C. players
Lincoln City F.C. players
Millwall F.C. players
Sittingbourne F.C. players
Catford Southend F.C. players
Coventry City F.C. players
Annfield Plain F.C. players
Midland Football League players
English Football League players
Date of death missing